Edinburgh Partners Ltd (EPL) is an independent fund management company based in Edinburgh, Scotland that specialises in Global, International, EAFE, European and Emerging Market equities. Founded independently in 2003, EPL is a wholly owned subsidiary of Franklin Templeton Investments since 2018.

History

Established in 2003, EPL is an asset manager focused on managing long-only equities. The first fund was EP Global Opportunities Trust plc, an Investment Trust launched in December 2003. The Edinburgh Partners Opportunities Fund plc range of open ended pooled funds followed in April 2004 and the range and diversity of products has grown since then.

Today, Edinburgh Partners invests on behalf of a range of clients including pension funds, financial institutions and endowments based around the world. Edinburgh Partners employs around 60 people and is headquartered in Melville Street, Edinburgh, with further offices in London and North America.

In October 2021, the CEO of Edinburgh Partners published the book, The End of the Everything Bubble: Why $75 trillion of investor wealth is in mortal jeopardy.

Leadership 

 Dr. Sandy Nairn – Chief Executive Officer
 Jamie Mackintosh – Client Service & Sales 
 Ken Fraser – Client Relations
 Tom Dickson – Director, Client Service & Sales

See also 
 Economy of Scotland
 Everything bubble
 Greenspan put

References

External links 
 Edinburgh Partners Ltd website

Investment management companies of the United Kingdom
Financial services companies established in 2003
Companies based in Edinburgh